Ask Aida is an interactive cooking show on the Food Network hosted by Aida Mollenkamp. The show began airing on August 2, 2008. On Ask Aida, Noah Starr serves as the "tech guru" sorting through then asking the many culinary questions sent to Mollenkamp via email, text, phone calls and video. Also during each episode, Noah tries to "stump" Aida with a crazy ingredient or gadget.  Each show also has an advertisement telling viewers how they can get a link to that episode's recipes via text message.

For Season 2, the format of the show changed slightly, Starr was removed from the program.

Episodes

Season 1
 Hot Off the Grill
 Steak and Potatoes
 Easy as Pie
 Eggs
 Catch of the Day
 Weeknight Dinners
 Pasta in Presto
 Mexican Night
 Sweet Morning
 Chicken
 Lasagna
 Double Dips
 Southern Comfort

Season 2
 Light & Healthy
 Quick and Affordable
 Simple Asian
 Game On
 Taqueria Mexicana
 Chocolate
 Pizza
 Comfort Food
 Fast With Five
 Veggies Rock
 One Dish Wonders
 Spring Is in the Air
 Mollenkamp Moms

Season 3
 Burger Bonanza
 Grilling Greats
 Cheesy Pasta
 Cookie Craze
 Steak, Rattle & Roll
 Chicken in a Flash
 Cheese Please
 Simple Stews
 Dinner Party Pork
 Chocolate Bliss
 Eggs-Travaganza
 Aida's Thanksgiving
 Aida's Holiday

References 

Food Network original programming
2000s American reality television series
2008 American television series debuts
2009 American television series endings